The 2021 Valparaiso Beacons football team represented Valparaiso University in the 2021 NCAA Division I FCS football season as a member of the Pioneer Football League. They  were led by third-year head coach Landon Fox and played their home games at Brown Field.

Schedule

References

Valparaiso
Valparaiso Beacons football seasons
Valparaiso Beacons football